Neither at Home or Abroad (Hungarian: Se ki, se be) is a 1919 Hungarian silent drama film directed by Alexander Korda and starring Lajos Ujváry, Hermin Haraszti and María Corda. Its title is also often translated as Neither In Nor Out.

Cast
 Lajos Ujváry   
 Hermin Haraszti   
 María Corda  
 László Z. Molnár   
 Nusi Somogyi   
 Gusztáv Vándory   
 Tivadar Uray   
 Janka Csatay

Bibliography
 Kulik, Karol. Alexander Korda: The Man Who Could Work Miracles. Virgin Books, 1990.

External links

1919 films
Hungarian silent films
Hungarian drama films
1910s Hungarian-language films
Films directed by Alexander Korda
Hungarian black-and-white films
1919 drama films
Silent drama films